Bangkok Dusit Medical Services (stock symbol: SET: BDMS) is Thailand's largest private healthcare group. It was founded by the Thai billionaire Prasert Prasarttong-Osoth.

There are six different hospitals with 34 hospital branches in the group: The seventeen branches of Bangkok Hospital, the BNH Hospital, the five branches of Phyathai Hospitals, the five Paolo Memorial Hospitals, the five branches of Samitivej Hospital and the Royal Bangkok Hospital

The company is listed on the Thai stock exchange, and is looking to expand to other countries.

See also
List of hospitals in Thailand

References

Prasarttong-Osoth Co., Ltd.
Healthcare companies of Thailand